The 1996 Croatia Open was a men's  tennis tournament played on outdoor clay courts at the ITC Stella Maris in Umag in Croatia and was part of the World Series of the 1996 ATP Tour. It was the seventh edition of the tournament and was held from 12 August through 18 August 1996. Fourth-seeded Carlos Moyá won the singles title.

Finals

Singles

 Carlos Moyá defeated  Félix Mantilla 6–0, 7–6(7–4)
 It was Moyá's only title of the year and the 2nd of his career.

Doubles

 Pablo Albano /  Luis Lobo defeated  Ģirts Dzelde /  Udo Plamberger 6–4, 6–1
 It was Albano's 2nd title of the year and the 4th of his career. It was Lobo's 2nd title of the year and the 5th of his career.

See also
 1996 Croatian Bol Ladies Open

References

External links
 Official website 
 ATP Tournament Profile

Croatia Open
Croatia Open
1996 in Croatian tennis